Julius Caesar Strauss (July 1857 - 1924), known professionally as J. C. Strauss, was an American photographer who was known as an internationally renowned craftsman and the most famous photographer in St. Louis, Missouri, at the turn of the 20th century.  Born in Cleveland, Ohio the penniless son of a Bavarian-born tailor, he left home and sneaked into St. Louis in 1876 and opened a photography studio in 1879. By the 1890s, he had built a gallery.  Although he was willing to experiment with different lighting and backgrounds, he insisted upon rigidly posed portraits.  Photographer Alfred Stieglitz from New York eventually over took the style and reputation of Strauss who continued to create pictures that looked more like paintings.  From the time of the St. Louis World's Fair until his death, Strauss' studio was a local tourist attraction.

References

External links

Strauss Family photographs in the J.C. Strauss Glass Plate Negative Collection at St. Louis Public Library
J.C. Strauss Portrait Collection at St. Louis Public Library
J.C. Strauss Glass Plate Negative Collection Finding Aid at the St. Louis Public Library
J.C. Strauss Portrait Collection at the St. Louis Public Library
J.C. Strauss Portrait Questionnaires Collection finding aid at the St. Louis Public Library

1857 births
1924 deaths
19th-century American photographers

20th-century American photographers
Artists from St. Louis
Pioneers of photography
Photographers from Missouri